The 35th Infantry Division, formerly known as the 35th Division, is an infantry formation of the Army National Guard at Fort Leavenworth.

The 35th Division was organized August 25, 1917, at Camp Doniphan, Oklahoma, as a unit of the National Guard, with troops from Missouri and Kansas. It was inactivated in 1919, but the division headquarters was reconstituted in 1935 and it served with a brief interruption until it was inactivated again in 1963. The division was reactivated and the headquarters and headquarters company federally recognized on August 25, 1984, at Fort Leavenworth, Kansas.

Shoulder sleeve insignia

The division's shoulder patch, a Santa Fe cross in a circle, was conceived as a marking for division vehicles and baggage in 1918, and was first promulgated by 35th Division General Orders Number 25, issued on 27 March 1918. It was officially approved for the 35th Division on 29 October 1918 by the adjutant general of the American Expeditionary Force. The marking was later stenciled onto signs identifying the whereabouts of division units, soldiers' helmets, and finally was made into a shoulder sleeve insignia when that usage was authorized.

Twenty-four distinct combinations of quadrant and border colors were devised for all of the 35th Division's units. Each major unit of the 35th Division (the division headquarters and headquarters troop and the 128th Machine Gun Battalion, the 110th Field Signal Battalion, 110th Ammunition, 110th Sanitary, and 110th Supply Trains, the 110th Engineer Regiment and Train, the 69th Infantry Brigade, the 70th Infantry Brigade, and the 60th Field Artillery Brigade) was respectively identified by one of six border colors: blue, green, white, yellow, black, or red. The component units each had their own combination of quadrant colors, consisting of one or two of the aforementioned. Patches varied widely in exact design and material.

Postwar, the wide variety of color combinations was done away with, and the insignia to be worn by all division personnel was simplified to consist of a white Santa Fe cross on a blue background with an olive drab border, although colored insignia continued in limited use in certain cases until the 1930s.

World War I

Major events
Ordered into federal service: 5 August 1917 (National Guard Division from Kansas and Missouri)
Overseas: 7 May 1918
Returned to U.S. and demobilized: April 1919.

Commanders
 Major General William M. Wright (25 August 1917)
 Brigadier General Lucien Grant Berry (18 September 1917)
 Major General William M. Wright (10 December 1917)
 Brigadier General Nathaniel F. McClure (15 June 1918)
 Major General Peter E. Traub (20 July 1918)
 Brigadier General Thomas B. Dugan (25 November 1918)
 Major General Peter E. Traub (7 December 1918)
 Brigadier General Thomas B. Dugan (27 December 1918 to inactivation)

Actions during World War I

The 35th Division arrived at Le Havre, France, on 11 May 1918. The 35th served first, a brigade at a time, in the Vosges mountains between 30 June and 13 August. The whole division served in the Gerardmer sector, Alsace, 14 August to 1 September; Meuse-Argonne, 21 to 30 September; Sommedieu sector, 15 October, to 6 November. Men of the division spent ninety-two days in quiet sectors and five in active; advanced twelve and one half kilometres against resistance, captured 781 prisoners, and lost 1,067 killed and 6,216 wounded. The 35th Division had as an officer Captain Harry Truman, 33rd President of the United States, who commanded Battery D of the 129th Field Artillery Regiment.

World War I order of battle
Units of the 35th Division during World War I included:
 Headquarters, 35th Division
 69th Infantry Brigade
 137th Infantry Regiment (1st Kansas Infantry less band, and 2nd Kansas Infantry)
 138th Infantry Regiment (1st Missouri Infantry, and 5th Missouri Infantry less band)
 129th Machine Gun Battalion (2nd Battalion, 2nd Missouri Infantry)
 70th Infantry Brigade
 139th Infantry Regiment (3rd Kansas Infantry, and 4th Missouri Infantry less band)
 140th Infantry Regiment (3rd Missouri Infantry, and 6th Missouri Infantry less band)
 130th Machine Gun Battalion (3rd Battalion, 2nd Missouri Infantry)
 60th Field Artillery Brigade
 128th Field Artillery Regiment (75 mm) (1st Missouri Field Artillery)
 129th Field Artillery Regiment (75 mm) (2nd Missouri Field Artillery and Troop B, Missouri Cavalry)
 130th Field Artillery Regiment (155 mm) (1st Kansas Field Artillery)
 110th Trench Mortar Battery (Supply Company and Headquarters Company (less band), 2nd Missouri Infantry)
 128th Machine Gun Battalion (Machine Gun Company and 1st Battalion, 2nd Missouri Infantry)
 110th Engineer Regiment (1st Separate Battalion Kansas Engineers, 1st Separate Battalion Missouri Engineers, and 1st Kansas Infantry)
 110th Field Signal Battalion (1st Battalion, Kansas Signal Corps)
 Headquarters Troop, 35th Division (Troop A, 1st Squadron Kansas Cavalry)
 110th Train Headquarters and Military Police (Troops B, C, and D, 1st Squadron Kansas Cavalry)
 110th Ammunition Train (National Army men)
 110th Supply Train (Supply Train, Missouri National Guard)
 110th Engineer Train (Engineer Train, Kansas National Guard)
 110th Sanitary Train
137th, 138th, 139th, and 140th Ambulance Companies and Field Hospitals (1st and 2nd Kansas Field Hospitals, 1st and 2nd Missouri Field Hospitals, 1st and 2nd Kansas Ambulance Companies, and 1st and 2nd Missouri Ambulance Companies)

Statistics
 Campaigns: Meuse-Argonne Offensive

Casualties
 Total battle casualties: 7,296 
 Killed in action: 1,018
 Wounded in action: 6,278

Interwar period

Pursuant to Section 3a of the 1920 amendments to the National Defense Act of 1916, a systematic effort was made to return units of the National Guard and Organized Reserve (which assumed the unit designations of the wartime National Army) to the states from which they had originated. In 1921, the 35th Division was reconstituted in the National Guard, allotted to the states of Kansas, Missouri, and Nebraska of the Seventh Corps Area, and assigned to the VII Corps.

In the postwar reorganization of the Army's infantry divisions, they only had two regiments of horse-drawn 75 mm guns, with truck-drawn 155 mm howitzers initially assigned as corps and army artillery because of the belief that they were too tactically immobile. As early as 1922, the Nebraska National Guard found it impossible to organize the VII Corps' 127th Field Artillery Regiment because a lack of funding and armory space. When suitable modifications were made to the 155 mm howitzer as part of the Army's motorization of field artillery in the early 1930s to allow for high-speed truck traction, 155 mm howitzer regiments were returned to divisions; the 142nd Field Artillery Regiment, a partially-organized General Headquarters Reserve (GHQR) 75 mm gun unit from Arkansas, was converted to 155 mm howitzers and assigned to the 35th Division on 13 July 1931 in lieu of the 127th Field Artillery.

Because of a lack of funding and disputes between the states allotted for the division. the 35th Division headquarters was not organized and federally recognized until 13 September 1935. In the 1920s and 1930s, constituent units of the division performed various activities policing labor troubles and effecting disaster relief. 180 Organized Reserve officers of the 89th and 102nd Divisions were also provided with training by the division. Due to limited funding, all the units of the 35th Division did not gather together in one place for training until the Fourth Army maneuvers at Fort Riley, Kansas in 1937. The division also concentrated at Camp Ripley, Minnesota, in 1940.

With the conversion of National Guard cavalry divisions to other types of units in 1940, Kansas' 114th Cavalry Regiment was converted and redesignated as the 127th Field Artillery Regiment and assigned to the 35th Division, and the 142nd Field Artillery Regiment was relieved from the division on 1 October 1940.

Peacetime activities

Special Troops, 35th Division
 35th Signal Company for communications duty in conjunction with a coal miners' strike in Columbus, Kansas, 17 June-6 August 1935

35th Division Quartermaster Train
 Elements for flood relief duty along the Republican River, 1–4 June 1935
 Entire train for martial law in conjunction with a streetcar workers' strike in Omaha, 7–19 June 1935

69th Infantry Brigade
 Brigade headquarters for command and control in conjunction with a streetcar workers' strike in Omaha, 7–19 June 1935

70th Infantry Brigade
 Headquarters company for riot control duty during a railroad workers' strike in Poplar Bluff, July 1922
 Headquarters and headquarters company for riot control duty during a riot at the Missouri State Prison, 25–27 March 1930

110th Medical Regiment
 Elements for riot control duty during a workers' strike at the Nebraska City meat packing plant, January–February 1922
 Elements for martial law in conjunction with a streetcar workers' strike in Omaha, 7–19 June 1935
 Elements for flood relief duty along the Republican River, 1–4 June 1935

130th Field Artillery Regiment
 1st Battalion for riot control duty during a coal miners' strike in Pittsburg, 14 December 1921 – 26 February 1922
 Several batteries for tornado relief duty in Hutchinson 13–15 January 1923, and Horton, 18–19 June 1923
 1st Battalion for flood relief duty in Hutchinson, July 1929

134th Infantry Regiment
 Five companies for riot control duty during a workers' strike at the Nebraska City meat packing plant, January–February 1922
 Two companies for riot control duty during a water rights dispute along the Platte River, 28 August-3 September 1935
 Entire regiment, less band, for martial law in conjunction with a streetcar workers' strike in Omaha, 15–21 June 1935

137th Infantry Regiment
 1st and 3rd Battalions for riot control duty during a coal miners' strike in Pittsburg, 14 December 1921 – 26 February 1922
 Tornado relief duty in Augusta, 13–16 July 1924
 2nd Battalion for road patrols and bridge blocks during a prison breakout in Lansing, 19–20 January 1934
 Regimental headquarters and 3rd Battalion for riot control duty during a copper miners' disturbance in Baxter Springs, 8–27 June 1934, and during a coal miners' strike in Columbus, 17 June-6 August 1935

138th Infantry Regiment
1st Battalion for riot control duty during a railroad workers' strike in Poplar Bluff, July 1922
Tornado relief duty in St. Louis, 29 September-6 October 1927

140th Infantry Regiment
 Riot control duty at railroad workers' strikes in Moberly, Macon, and Poplar Bluff, 13 July-23 November 1922, and during a workers' strike in New Madrid, May 1923
 Flood relief duty along the Mississippi River at Charleston, Sikeston, and Poplar Bluff, 16 April-12 May 1927 and January 1937, and along the St. Francis River, June 1928, and every spring 1932-1933 and 1935-1938

142nd Field Artillery Regiment
 Entire regiment for flood relief duty in Forrest City, Camp Barton, and Jonesboro, January–February 1937

161st Field Artillery Regiment
 Three batteries for road patrols and bridge blocks during a prison breakout in Lansing, 19–20 January 1934
 2nd Battalion for riot control duty during a coal miners' strike in Columbus, 17–25 June 1935
 1st Battalion for riot control duty during a coal miners' strike in Columbus, 28 June-6 August 1935

Order of battle, 1924

Italics indicates that the given 35th Division unit was unorganized or inactive at the time.

Headquarters, 35th Division (Missouri National Guard)
Headquarters, Special Troops (Missouri National Guard)
Headquarters Company (Warrensburg, Missouri)
35th Military Police Company (Kansas National Guard)
35th Signal Company (Kansas City, Kansas)
35th Ordnance Company (Medium) (Kansas National Guard)
35th Tank Company (Light) (St. Joseph, Missouri)
Motorcycle Company Number 110 (Kansas National Guard)
69th Infantry Brigade (Topeka, Kansas)
134th Infantry Regiment (Omaha, Nebraska)
137th Infantry Regiment (Horton, Kansas)
70th Infantry Brigade (Jefferson City, Missouri)
138th Infantry Regiment (St. Louis, Missouri)
140th Infantry Regiment (Caruthersville, Missouri)
60th Field Artillery Brigade (Topeka, Kansas)
110th Ammunition Train (Kansas National Guard)
130th Field Artillery Regiment (Topeka, Kansas)
161st Field Artillery Regiment (Topeka, Kansas)
110th Engineer Regiment (Kansas City, Missouri)
110th Medical Regiment (Lincoln, Nebraska)
35th Division Trains (Lincoln, Nebraska)
35th Division Air Service (St. Louis, Missouri)

Order of battle, 1939

Headquarters, 35th Division (Kansas City, Missouri)
Division commander (Kansas City, Missouri)
Division Headquarters Detachment (Warrensburg, Missouri)
Headquarters, Special Troops (St. Joseph, Missouri)
Medical Department Detachment (St. Joseph, Missouri)
Headquarters Company, 35th Division (Warrensburg, Missouri)
35th Military Police Company (Garden City, Kansas)
35th Signal Company (Kansas City, Kansas)
35th Tank Company (St. Joseph, Missouri)
110th Ordnance Company (Kansas National Guard)
69th Infantry Brigade (Omaha, Nebraska)
134th Infantry Regiment (Omaha, Nebraska)
137th Infantry Regiment (Horton, Kansas)
70th Infantry Brigade (Jefferson City, Missouri)
138th Infantry Regiment (St. Louis, Missouri)
140th Infantry Regiment (Caruthersville, Missouri)
60th Field Artillery Brigade (Topeka, Kansas)
110th Ammunition Train (Kansas National Guard)
130th Field Artillery Regiment (Topeka, Kansas)
142nd Field Artillery Regiment (El Dorado, Arkansas)
161st Field Artillery Regiment (Topeka, Kansas)
110th Engineer Regiment (Kansas City, Missouri)
110th Medical Regiment (Lincoln, Nebraska)
110th Quartermaster Regiment (Lincoln, Nebraska)

World War II

Federalization

The 35th Division was ordered into federal service on 23 December 1940 at home stations. The division's units were ordered to report to Camp Joseph T. Robinson, Arkansas, and had arrived by the end of January, 1941. The incomplete ranks of the 35th were swelled by thousands of draftees, a large portion of whom, through the allowance of local recruitment while National Guard divisions were increasing their strength, were ordered to join the division from the states where the division's units had originated. After completing the War Department-mandated divisional training program, the 35th Division maneuvered against other units in Arkansas and Louisiana in the fall of 1941. After the Pearl Harbor attack came its first assignment, the defense of the Southern California Sector of the Western Defense Command.

Reorganization

On 3 February 1942, it was ordered by the War Department that the 35th Division be "triangularized," losing its infantry and field artillery brigade headquarters. The 138th Infantry Regiment departed, assigned to GHQ. The 35th Division's engineer, field artillery, quartermaster, and medical regiments were reorganized as battalions. The reorganization was completed on 1 March 1942, and the division was redesignated as the 35th Infantry Division. On 27 January 1943, the 140th Infantry Regiment was relieved from the division, and was replaced by the 320th Infantry Regiment.

Further training

The newly-christened 35th Infantry Division departed California for Camp Rucker, Alabama, arriving on 1 April 1943. After participating in the Second Army Tennessee Maneuvers from 22 November 1943 to 17 January 1944 and receiving mountain warfare training at the West Virginia Maneuver Area from 21 February to 28 March 1944, the 35th Infantry Division was declared ready for overseas service. Further movement to Camp Butner, North Carolina, and Camp Kilmer, New Jersey, saw the division through to England, where it arrived on 25 May 1944.

Commanders
 Major General Ralph E. Truman (December 1940 – October 1941)
 Major General William H. Simpson (October 1941 – April 1942)
 Major General Maxwell Murray (May 1942 – January 1943)
 Major General Paul W. Baade (January 1943 to inactivation)

Actions during World War II

The 35th Infantry Division arrived in England on 25 May 1944 and received further training. It landed on Omaha Beach, Normandy 5–7 July 1944 and entered combat on 11 July, fighting in the Normandy hedgerows north of St. Lo. The division turned away twelve German counterattacks at Emelie before entering St. Lo on 18 July. After mopping up in the St. Lo area, it took part in the offensive action southwest of St. Lo, pushing the Germans across the Vire River on 2 August, and breaking out of the Cotentin Peninsula. While en route to an assembly area, the division was "flagged off the road," to secure the Mortain-Avranches corridor and to rescue the 30th Division's "Lost Battalion" August 7–13, 1944.

Then racing across France through Orleans and Sens, the division attacked across the Moselle on 13 September, captured Nancy on 15 September, secured Chambrey on 1 October, and drove on to the German border, taking Sarreguemines and crossing the Saar on 8 December. After crossing the Blies River on 12 December, the division moved to Metz for rest and rehabilitation on 19 December. The 35th moved to Arlon, Belgium December 25–26, and took part in the fighting to relieve Bastogne, throwing off the attacks of four German divisions, taking Villers-laBonne-Eau on 10 January, after a 13-day fight and Lutrebois in a 5-day engagement. On 18 January 1945, the division returned to Metz to resume its interrupted rest.

In late January, the division was defending the Foret de Domaniale area. Moving to the Netherlands to hold a defensive line along the Roer on 22 February, the division attacked across the Roer on 23 February, pierced the Siegfried Line, reached the Rhine at Wesel on 10 March, and crossed 25–26 March. It smashed across the Herne Canal and reached the Ruhr River early in April, when it was ordered to move to the Elbe April 12. Making the 295-mile dash in two days, the 35th mopped up in the vicinity of Colbitz and Angern, until 26 April 1945 when it moved to Hanover for occupational and mopping-up duty, continuing occupation beyond VE-day. The division left Southampton, England, on 5 September, and arrived in New York City on 10 September 1945.

Assignments in the ETO

5 May 1944: XV Corps, Third Army.
8 July 1944: Third Army, but attached to the XIX Corps of First Army.
27 July 1944: V Corps.
1 August 1944: Third Army, Twelfth United States Army Group, but attached to the V Corps of First Army.
5 August 1944: Third Army, 12th Army Group.
6 August 1944: XX Corps.
9 August 1944: Third Army, 12th Army Group, but attached to the VII Corps of First Army.
13 August 1944: XII Corps, Third Army, 12th Army Group.
23 December 1944: Third Army, 12th Army Group.
24 December 1944: XX Corps.
26 December 1944: III Corps.
18 January 1945: XX Corps.
23 January 1945: XV Corps, Sixth United States Army Group.
30 January 1945: XVI Corps, Ninth Army, attached to the British 21st Army Group, 12th Army Group.
4 April 1945: XVI Corps, Ninth Army, 12th Army Group.
13 April 1945: XIX Corps for operations, and the XIII Corps for administration.
16 April 1945: XIII Corps.

World War II order of battle
Units of the 35th Infantry Division from March 1942 included:
 Headquarters, 35th Infantry Division
 134th Infantry Regiment
 137th Infantry Regiment
 320th Infantry Regiment
 Headquarters and Headquarters Battery, 35th Infantry Division Artillery
 127th Field Artillery Battalion (155 mm)
 161st Field Artillery Battalion (105 mm)
 216th Field Artillery Battalion (105 mm)
 219th Field Artillery Battalion (105 mm)
 60th Engineer Combat Battalion
 110th Medical Battalion
 35th Cavalry Reconnaissance Troop (Mechanized)
 Headquarters, Special Troops, 35th Infantry Division
 Headquarters Company, 35th Infantry Division
 735th Ordnance Light Maintenance Company
 35th Quartermaster Company
 35th Signal Company
 Military Police Platoon
 Band
 35th Counterintelligence Corps Detachment

Statistics
Campaigns: Normandy, Northern France, Rhineland, Ardennes-Alsace, Central Europe
Days of combat: 264

Awards
Unit Awards:
Distinguished Unit Citations: 7
134th Infantry Regiment, for extraordinary heroism in connection with military operations against the enemy during the period 28 December 1944 through 16 January 1945 (War Department General Orders No. 62, 1947)
1st Battalion, 134th Infantry Regiment, for extraordinary heroism and outstanding performance of duty against the enemy in the vicinity of Saint-Lô, Normandy, France, from 15 to 19 July 1944 (War Department General Orders No. 66, 1945)
Company C, 134th Infantry Regiment, for extraordinary heroism and outstanding performance of duty against the enemy in the vicinity of Habkirchen, Germany, from 12 to 21 December 1944 (War Department General Orders No. 68, 1945)
2nd (machine gun) Platoon, Company D, 134th Infantry Regiment, for extraordinary heroism in action against the enemy in the vicinity of Habkirchen, Germany, from 12 to 21 December 1944 (War Department General Orders No. 66, 1945)
Company F, 137th Infantry Regiment, for outstanding performance of duty in action against the enemy at Sarreguemines, France, on 10 December 1944 (War Department General Orders No. 11, 1946)
3rd Battalion, 137th Infantry Regiment, for outstanding performance of duty in action against the enemy in France, 18–21 November 1944 (War Department General Orders No. 20, 1946)
1st Battalion, 320th Infantry Regiment, for extraordinary heroism and outstanding performance of duty in action against the enemy in the vicinity of Mortain, France, from 10 to 13 August 1944 (War Department General Orders No. 55, 1945)
 Meritorious Service Unit Plaques: 22
Individual Awards: 
 Medal of Honor: 1 (Staff Sergeant Junior J. Spurrier)
 Distinguished Service Cross: 44
 Distinguished Service Medal: 1
 Silver Star Medal: 688
 Legion of Merit: 10
 Distinguished Flying Cross: 1
 Soldier's Medal: 22
 Bronze Star Medal: 3,435
 Air Medal: 133

Casualties
Total battle casualties: 15,822
Killed in action: 2,485
Wounded in action: 11,526
Missing in action: 340
Prisoner of war: 1,471

Cold War to present

On 7 December 1945, the division was inactivated at Camp Breckinridge, Kentucky. During the next year and into 1947, the division was reestablished as a Kansas and Missouri National Guard division. In 1954 the division consisted of the 137th (Kansas), 138th (Missouri), and 140th Infantry Regiments (Missouri); 127th, 128th, 129th, and 154th Field Artillery Battalions; the 135th Antiaircraft Artillery Battalion; the 135th Tank Battalion; and signals, engineer, reconnaissance, military police, other combat support units, plus combat service support units. After the Pentomic reorganization, the division's five battle groups were the 1-137 Infantry; 2-137 Infantry; 1-138 Infantry; 2-138 Infantry; and 1-140 Infantry. In 1963 the division was inactivated along with three other National Guard divisions.

In early 1983, the Army began the process of reestablishing the division as a mechanized infantry formation to be made up of Kansas, Missouri, Nebraska, Colorado, and Kentucky National Guard units. The division headquarters was established 30 September 1983, at Fort Leavenworth. The division was formally reactivated as the 35th Infantry Division (Mechanized) on 25 August 1984 from the 67th Infantry Brigade (Mechanized) of Nebraska, the 69th Infantry Brigade (Mechanized) of Kansas, and the 149th Armored Brigade from Kentucky. It continues in service today.

In 1984–85, the 69th Infantry Brigade was reported to consist of the following units:

1st Battalion, 137th Infantry
2d Battalion, 137th Infantry
1st Battalion, 635th Armor
1st Battalion, 127th Field Artillery
Troop E, 114th Cavalry
169th Engineer Company.

Isby and Kamps also wrote at the same time that the 110th Engineer Battalion, in Missouri, might be assigned as the divisional engineers (p383); however, this did not occur. Actually, the divisional engineer battalion, the 206th Engineer Battalion, was organized in the Kentucky Army National Guard on 1 November 1985.

The divisional aviation brigade headquarters was organized in the Kentucky Army National Guard on 15 September 1986. On 1 October 1987 the division's aviation units were reorganized, and the 135th Aviation was established. Two battalions of the 135th joined the division's aviation component.

Bosnia
 
The 35th Infantry Division Headquarters commanded Task Force Eagle's Multi-National Division North in Bosnia and Herzegovina as part of SFOR-13 (Stabilization Force 13) with the NATO peacekeeping mandate under the Dayton Peace Accords. The headquarters were located at Eagle Base in the town of Tuzla. Brigadier General James Mason was the commander. He later went on to command the division. The division headquarters received the Army Superior Unit Award for its service in Bosnia.  Division liaison officers served in the towns of Mostar, Sarajevo, Banja Luka, Zenica and Doboj. Several officers went on to other roles, including: Timothy J. Kadavy who served as Commander of 1st Squadron, 167th Cavalry, 35th Infantry Division in Bosnia. Lieutenant General Kadavy is now the Vice Chief of the National Guard Bureau. Victor J. Braden served as the Commander, 1st Battalion, 108th Aviation, 35th Infantry Division in Tuzla, Bosnia. Major General Braden was a recent Commander of the 35th Infantry Division. . Elliott Levenson was the Liaison Officer to the Italian Command at Multinational Brigade, South-East in Mostar, Bosnia. He earned the Bronze Star in Iraq with the 4th Brigade Combat Team, 1st Cavalry Division in 2008. .

Hurricane Katrina
The division provided headquarters control for National Guard units deployed to Louisiana in the aftermath of Hurricane Katrina. while the 38th Infantry Division did the same for Mississippi.

Kosovo
A detachment of the 35th Infantry Division was the headquarters element for Task Force Falcon of Multi-National Task Force East (MNTF-E) for the NATO Kosovo Force 9 (KFOR 9) mission. The 35th provided command and control from 7 November 2007 until 7 July 2008, when they were succeeded by the 110th Maneuver Enhancement Brigade, Missouri Army National Guard.

Current structure

The 35th Infantry Division currently exercises training and readiness oversight over a special troops battalion, a weather flight unit, four infantry brigade combat teams, a combat aviation brigade, a maneuver enhancement brigade, and a field artillery brigade of the Army National Guard but they are not organic to the division.  Specifically, these units are as follows:
Special Troops Battalion, 35th Infantry Division
127th Weather Flight (Kansas Air National Guard)
39th Infantry Brigade Combat Team (BCT) (Arkansas National Guard)
Headquarters and Headquarters Company (HHC), 39th IBCT
1st Squadron, 134th Cavalry Regiment (Nebraska Army National Guard)
1st Battalion, 138th Infantry Regiment (Missouri Army National Guard)
1st Battalion, 153rd Infantry Regiment
2nd Battalion, 153rd Infantry Regiment
1st Battalion, 206th Field Artillery Regiment (FAR)
239th Brigade Engineer Battalion (BEB)
39th Brigade Support Battalion (BSB)
45th Infantry BCT (Oklahoma National Guard)
HHC, 45th IBCT
1st Squadron, 180th Cavalry Regiment
2nd Battalion, 134th Infantry Regiment (Airborne) (Nebraska Army National Guard) 
1st Battalion, 179th Infantry Regiment
1st Battalion, 279th Infantry Regiment
1st Battalion, 160th FAR
545th BEB
700th BSB
  155th Armored BCT (Mississippi Army National Guard)
 HHC, 155th Armored BCT
  1st Squadron, 98th Cavalry Regiment
 2nd Battalion, 198th Armor Regiment
  1st Battalion, 635th Armor Regiment (Kansas Army National Guard)
  1st Battalion, 155th Infantry Regiment
 2nd Battalion, 114th FAR
 150th BEB
 160th BSB
Combat Aviation Brigade (CAB), 35th Infantry Division
 HHC, CAB, 35th Infantry Division
1st Battalion, 135th Aviation Regiment
2nd Battalion, 135th Aviation Regiment
1st Battalion, 108th Aviation Regiment (Kansas Army National Guard)
935th Aviation Support Battalion
110th Maneuver Enhancement Brigade (Missouri National Guard)
230th Sustainment Brigade (Tennessee National Guard)

Readiness units:
67th Maneuver Enhancement Brigade
130th Field Artillery Brigade (Kansas Army National Guard)
Headquarters and Headquarters Battery
2nd Battalion, 130th FAR
1st Battalion, 161st FAR
1st Battalion, 129th FAR (Missouri National Guard)

Notable members
 Captain Harry S Truman, President of the United States; commanded Battery D, 129th Field Artillery, 60th Field Artillery Brigade
 Captain Alexander R. Skinker, Medal of Honor, WWI, Battle of the Meuse-Argonne, 138th Infantry Regiment
 Private Nels Wold, Medal of Honor, WWI, Battle of the Meuse-Argonne, 138th Infantry Regiment
 Second Lieutenant Erwin Russell Bleckley, Medal of Honor, WWI, Battle of the Meuse-Argonne, 130th Field Artillery Regiment, Kansas
 Harry H. Vaughan
 Staff Sergeant Junior J. Spurrier, Medal of Honor, WWII, Achain, France, 13 November 1944, Distinguished Service Cross, WWII, Lay St. Christopher, France, 16 September 1944, 134th Infantry Regiment
 Master Sergeant Robert Pirosh- screenwriter, served during WWII

In popular culture
 The 35th Infantry Division is featured in the 1970 film Kelly's Heroes
 Mickey Rooney as Andy Hardy in 1947 film "Love Laughs at Andy Hardy " wears the 35th Infantry Division patch.
 The fictional unit in the film From Here to Eternity wears the 35th ID patch.

See also

 Formations of the United States Army during World War I
 Formations of the United States Army during World War II
 Formations of the United States Army during the War on Terrorism
 Meuse-Argonne order of battle
 Normandy order of battle
 Rhineland order of battle
 Ardennes-Alsace order of battle
 Clair Kenamore, military historian

Notes

References

Further reading

External links

 Official

 
 General information
 35th Division Association
 35th Infantry Division in World War II, 1941–1945
 35th Infantry Division Memory
 LoneSentry.com (Attack! The Story of the 35th Infantry Division)
 
 Presenting the 35th Infantry Division in World War II 1941 - 1945 (unit history)
 

1917 establishments in Oklahoma
1919 disestablishments in Kansas
1926 establishments in Missouri
1945 disestablishments in Kentucky
1946 establishments in Kansas
1963 disestablishments in Kansas
1984 establishments in Kansas
Infantry divisions of the United States Army
Military units and formations established in 1917
Military units and formations disestablished in 1919
Military units and formations established in 1926
Military units and formations disestablished in 1945
Military units and formations established in 1946
Military units and formations disestablished in 1963
Military units and formations established in 1984
United States Army divisions of World War I
Infantry divisions of the United States Army in World War II
Infantry Division, U.S. 035th